Azerbaijan participated in the Junior Eurovision Song Contest 2013 in Kyiv, Ukraine. The Azerbaijani entry was selected through an internal selection. On 1 November 2013 it was revealed that Rustam Karimov would represent Azerbaijan in the contest. It was announced that his song would be called "Me and My Guitar".

Before Junior Eurovision
On 9 October, it was reported that the Azerbaijani broadcaster İctimai Television decided to internally select their 2013 artist with auditions held in the Rashid Behbudov Second Music School in Baku. On 1 November 2013, İctimai revealed that 10-year-old Rustam Karimov would represent Azerbaijan. The title of the song was revealed to be "Me and My Guitar", and the song was presented to the public on 5 November 2013.

Artist and song information

Rustam Karimov

Rustam Karimov (born August 18, 2003) is an Azerbaijani child singer.  He is known by his appearance at the Junior Eurovision Song Contest 2013 with his song "Me and My Guitar". Rustam Karimov was born in the capital of Azerbaijan, Baku on August 18, 2003. He started singing at the age of two and soon understood that music was his talent. Rustam Karimov arranged family concerts and has become the "singing hero" during kindergarten. In 2011, Rustam Karimov signed up at the Rashid Beybutov Music School to study piano.

At Junior Eurovision 
During the allocation draw on 25 November 2013, Azerbaijan was drawn to perform 2nd, following Sweden and preceding Armenia. Azerbaijan placed 7th, scoring 66 points.

In Azerbaijan, show were broadcast on İctimai Television with commentary by Konul Arifziki. The Azerbaijani spokesperson revealing the result of the Azerbaijani vote was Lyaman Mirzalieva.

Voting

Notes

References

Junior Eurovision Song Contest
Azerbaijan
2013